Resistance is a studio album by Jamaican reggae singer Burning Spear. It was released in 1985 through Heartbeat Records, making it the artist's first release for the label. Recording sessions took place at Tuff Gong Recording Studio in Kingston, horns on "Jah Feeling" and "Mek We Yadd" were recorded at Aquarius Studios Kingston.

It was nominated for a Grammy Award for Best Reggae Recording at the 27th Annual Grammy Awards.

Track listing

Personnel
Winston Rodney – vocals, akete, producer
Richard Anthony Johnson – keyboards, piano, organ, Casio MT-40, Fender Rhodes
Bobby Kalphat – organ
Winston Wright – piano, clarinet
Robert Lyn – synthesizer
Peter Ashbourne – Prophet-5 synthesizer
Lenford Richard – lead guitar
Devon Bradshaw – rhythm guitar
Michael Wilson – lead & rhythm guitar
Anthony Bradshaw – bass
Nelson Miller – drums, fundé, co-producer
Alvin Haughton – percussion
Dean Fraser – saxophone
Herman Marquis – saxophone
Glen DaCosta – tenor saxophone (track 2)
Ronald "Nambo" Robinson – trombone
Calvin "Bubbles" Cameron – trombone
Barrington Xavier Bailey – trombone
Leslie Wint – trumpet, flugelhorn
David Madden – trumpet
Junior "Chico" Chin – trumpet (track 7)
Errol Brown – recording
Jack Nuber – mixing
Mervyn Williams – assistant engineering (tracks: 2, 8)
Christopher Lewis – assistant engineering
David Young – assistant mixing
Wicked and Wild – art concept and photography

References

External links

1985 albums
Burning Spear albums
Heartbeat Records albums